141 may refer to:

 141 (number), an integer
 AD 141, a year of the Julian calendar
 141 BC, a year of the pre-Julian Roman calendar